Motueka Ward is a ward of Tasman District in the north of the South Island of New Zealand.

References 

Tasman District